Harvey J. Mallery was a Michigan politician.

Political life
The Flint City Commission select him as mayor in 1930 for a single year as the first City Commission Mayor under the 1929 charter.

References

Mayors of Flint, Michigan
20th-century American politicians